Brian Williams (born July 2, 1979) is a former American football cornerback. He was drafted by the Minnesota Vikings in the fourth round of the 2002 NFL Draft. He played college football at North Carolina State.

He has also played for the Jacksonville Jaguars, Atlanta Falcons, and New York Giants.

College career
Williams attended North Carolina State University and was a student and a letterman in football. In football, he was a three-year starter for as a cornerback and finished his collegiate career with 262 tackles (nine for loss), 5 interceptions, 20 passes defensed, 1 sack, 2 fumble recoveries, 1 forced fumble, and 5 blocked kicks.

Professional career

Minnesota Vikings
Williams was drafted in the fourth round of the 2002 NFL Draft by the Minnesota Vikings.

Jacksonville Jaguars
On March 11, 2006, he was signed by the Jacksonville Jaguars as an unrestricted free agent.

The Jaguars released Williams on September 5, 2009.

Atlanta Falcons
Williams signed with the Atlanta Falcons on September 6, 2009.
On October 18, in a Sunday night game against the Chicago Bears, Williams tore his ACL defending a pass.  Williams was out for the remainder of the 2009 season.  After the 2009 season, Williams became an unrestricted free agent.  The Falcons re-signed him on March 4, 2010 to a one-year contract.

New York Giants
On August 24, 2011, Williams signed with the New York Giants, but he was released on October 5.

References

1979 births
Living people
Sportspeople from High Point, North Carolina
Players of American football from North Carolina
American football cornerbacks
NC State Wolfpack football players
Minnesota Vikings players
Jacksonville Jaguars players
Atlanta Falcons players
New York Giants players
Ed Block Courage Award recipients